Puranmal Lahoti Government Polytechnic Latur, also referred to as PLGPL is the Maharashtra' one of the oldest institutes of technology, founded in 1956 and located along Ausa Road in Latur. It provides associate degree which is known as 'Diploma' in India.  In India a Diploma in Engineering is a specific academic award usually awarded in technical or vocational courses e.g. Engineering, Pharmacy, Designing, etc.

Puranmal Lahoti Government Polytechnic Latur has a distinguished history in Electrical Engineering, Mechanical Engineering, Civil Engineering, Electronics, Computer Engineering and Information Technology, and was also known for its outreach programs to encourage latest education in Latur elementary and high schools.

Latur Campus
Puranmal Lahoti Government Polytechnic Latur played a leadership role in bringing about Latur Center, one of the largest urban campus-in the state and the largest in Marathwada. Today, the 36-acre (65,000 m²), $26 million complex is home to the Institute and several technology-dependent companies, including Rudrani Infotech and Canda India Institute of Linkage. PLGPL has proven to be a case study in effective university, corporate, government and private-developer cooperation.

Academics

Departments 
Civil Engineering
Mechanical Engineering
Electrical Engineering
Electronics Engineering
Computer Engineering
Information Technology

Rankings 
The most recent Narsee Monjee Award Winner for best Polytechnic ranking placed the school in the tier.

Laboratories and other facilities
P.L. Government Polytechnic has one of the best Science and Engineering library in Latur. The major engineering laboratories at Polytechnic includes:
 CNC tooling Laboratory
 Engineering Survey and GIS
 Hydraulics Laboratory
 Computing and Computer Science Laboratory

References

Universities and colleges in Maharashtra
Polytechnics in Latur
Educational institutions established in 1956
1956 establishments in Bombay State